Christian Stephen Scales (born 3 December 1996) is an English footballer who plays as a defender.

Career
Scales was born in Hertfordshire and began his career at the Norwich City academy. He left for Crystal Palace in the summer of 2014 and signed a professional contract with the club in April 2015. On 20 August 2015, Scales joined League Two side Crawley Town on loan. He made his Football League debut on 22 August 2015 in a 3–0 win away at Cambridge United.

On 6 May 2016, it was announced that Scales was being released by Crystal Palace. Following a week's trial at FC Liefering who play in the First League, the second tier of Austrian football, he signed for National League South side Whitehawk in February 2017.

In July 2017, he signed a two-year contract with National League side Leyton Orient. He then went on a month's loan to Isthmian League Premier Division club Harlow Town, but was injured on his debut, the 2–0 win over Lowestoft Town on 26 August. He subsequently returned to Orient for treatment.

In February 2018, Scales returned on loan to Harlow after the completion of his recovery.

In December 2018, Scales joined Swedish Division 2 side Skellefteå on a two-year deal.

Career statistics

References

External links

Swedish football stats

1996 births
Living people
English footballers
English Football League players
Norwich City F.C. players
Crystal Palace F.C. players
Crawley Town F.C. players
Whitehawk F.C. players
Leyton Orient F.C. players
Harlow Town F.C. players
Association football defenders
Footballers from Hertfordshire
English expatriate footballers
English expatriate sportspeople in Sweden
Skellefteå FF players